The Price He Paid is a 1914 American silent melodrama film, directed by Lawrence McGill. It stars Philip Hahn, Gertrude Shipman, and Julia Hurley, and was released on December 7, 1914. The film is inspired by the Ella Wheeler Wilcox poem of the same name.

Cast list
 Philip Hahn as Richard
 Gertrude Shipman as Lucie, his wife
 Julia Hurley as Granny
 Edith Hinkle as Mrs. Lyons
 Reeva Greenwood as Patrice
 Jack Standing as The doctor
 Thomas V. Emery as Charlie Duke

References

External links 
 
 
 

Melodrama films
Films based on poems
Silent American drama films
1914 drama films
1914 films
American silent feature films
1910s English-language films
1910s American films